The Disney Ambassador Hotel was the first Disney-branded hotel built at Tokyo Disney Resort in Urayasu, Chiba, Japan. It opened on July 20, 2000, and was constructed under a license by The Walt Disney Company. The hotel is managed by The Oriental Land Company.

History 
The hotel was the Tokyo resort's first officially Disney-branded hotel, but the sixth hotel on the Tokyo Disney Resort property. The Disney Ambassador Hotel is located next to Ikspiari, an "entertainment district" similar to the Downtown Disney area of the Disneyland Resort and Disney Springs at the Walt Disney World Resort. The Ambassador opened in 2000 and was designed by the 2011 Driehaus Prize winner Robert A. M. Stern and Paul L. Whalen.

Guest rooms 
The Ambassador has five typical types of rooms: the Standard Room, the Superior Room and the Triple Room, which offers three full-sized beds, as well as the Deluxe Room and the Family Room with four beds, capable of accommodating six adults.

Dining 
The hotel has five dining options.
 Chef Mickey - character dining, buffet
 Empire Grill - California-style cuisine
 Hana - Japanese restaurant
 Tick Tock Diner - 50s diner-themed Café
 Hyperion Lounge

References 

Hotel buildings completed in 2000
Hotels in Tokyo Disney Resort
Hotels established in 2000
Robert A. M. Stern buildings
New Classical architecture